Tagetes lacera is a Mexican species of marigolds in the family Asteraceae. It has been found only in the State of Baja California Sur in western Mexico.

Tagetes lacera is a hairless perennial herb up to 100 cm (40 inches) tall. Leaves are pinnately compound, up to 15 cm (6 inches) long including a large leaflet at the end much larger than the side leaflets and about half the length of the leaf. The plant produces one yellow Flower head per branch.

References

External links

lacera
Flora of Baja California Sur
Endemic flora of Mexico
Plants described in 1890
Taxa named by Townshend Stith Brandegee